Granby Dam (National ID # CO01656) is an earthfill dam that dams the Colorado River  northeast of Granby, Colorado in Grand County, Colorado. The Granby Dam's reservoir is known as Lake Granby, the largest reservoir component of the Colorado-Big Thompson Project. Lake Granby stores Colorado River water that is diverted under the Continental Divide for agriculture and municipal use within north-eastern Colorado including the cities of Boulder, Fort Collins, Loveland, and Greeley. In addition to the waters of the Colorado, water from Willow Creek just below the dam is pumped up  to Lake Granby. Water from Lake Granby is pumped  higher by the Granby Pumping Plant to the Granby Pump Canal, which extents  to Shadow Mountain Lake, from which water is diverted through the Alva B. Adams Tunnel to the East Slope.

This damsite does not generate any power directly; power is generated at other locations in the Colorado-Big Thompson Project.

References

External links
USBR Granby Dam Website

Dams on the Colorado River
Dams in Colorado
Buildings and structures in Grand County, Colorado
United States Bureau of Reclamation dams
Dams completed in 1950
Earth-filled dams